Jostein Goksøyr (28 June 1922 – 5 December 2000) was a Norwegian microbiologist.

He was born in Kopervik, and took the dr.philos. degree in 1955. He was hired as a lecturer at the University of Bergen in 1956, and was later professor from 1966 to 1989. He was a member of the Norwegian Academy of Science and Letters from 1970 and the Royal Society of Sciences in Uppsala from 1987.

A planctomycete bacterium, Bythopirellula goksoyri, identified from the iron-hydroxide deposits at the Mohns Ridge, a part of the Arctic Mid-Ocean Ridge, is named in honour of Goksøyr.

References

1922 births
2000 deaths
Norwegian microbiologists
Academic staff of the University of Bergen
Members of the Norwegian Academy of Science and Letters
People from Karmøy